Superficial iliac circumflex can refer to:
 Superficial iliac circumflex artery
 Superficial iliac circumflex vein